Rykers Solomon (born October 4, 1965) is a Nauruan politician.

Parliamentary role

Solomon was  elected to parliament in the 2007 general elections, gaining the seat of Dogabe Jeremiah. He has been re-elected in the 2008 polls. He was defeated for re-election in 2013.

Parliamentary constituency

He represented Meneng in the Parliament of Nauru.

Background

Solomon is a close relative of weightlifter and Olympian participant Reanna Solomon.

See also

 Politics of Nauru
 Elections in Nauru
 2008 Nauruan parliamentary election

References

Members of the Parliament of Nauru
1965 births
Living people
People from Meneng District
Environment ministers of Nauru
21st-century Nauruan politicians